A graphics library is a program library designed to aid in rendering computer graphics to a monitor. This typically involves providing optimized versions of functions that handle common rendering tasks. This can be done purely in software and running on the CPU, common in embedded systems, or being hardware accelerated by a GPU, more common in PCs. By employing these functions, a program can assemble an image to be output to a monitor. This relieves the programmer of the task of creating and optimizing these functions, and allows them to focus on building the graphics program. Graphics libraries are mainly used in video games and simulations.

The use of graphics libraries in connection with video production systems, such as Pixar RenderMan, is not covered here. 

Some APIs use Graphics Library (GL) in their name, notably OpenGL and WebGL.

Examples
 Allegro
ANGLE
 Apple Macintosh QuickDraw
 Cairo (graphics)
 Clutter
 DFPSR https://dawoodoz.com/dfpsr.html (GUI toolkit and software renderer)
 DirectX (a library created by Microsoft, to run under Windows operating systems and 'Direct' Xbox)
 Display PostScript
 emWin An Embedded Graphics Library
 FLTK A GUI Toolkit and Graphics Library
 GTK A GUI toolkit
 Mesa 3D (a library that implements OpenGL)
 MiniGL (a range of incomplete OpenGL implementations)
 MIT X Window System
 Open Inventor
 Qt A cross-platform application framework
 SFML
 SIGIL (Sound, Input, and Graphics Integration Library)
 Simple DirectMedia Layer
 Skia Graphics Library

See also
 Anti-Grain Geometry
 Software development kit (SDK)
 OpenGL ES
 Graphical Widget toolkit graphical control elements drawn on bitmap displays
 |Utility Library for Imaging System

References

 

hu:Grafikus programkönyvtár